is a Japanese voice actress and singer from Tokushima City, Tokushima Prefecture.

Filmography

Anime
1997
Coji-Coji (Piroro)

2001
Comic Party (Ikumi Tachikawa)
Chibi Maruko-chan (Natsumi Murata)

2002
Happy Lesson (Uzuki Shitennō)
Ground Defense Force! Mao-chan (Mao Onigawara)
Samurai Deeper Kyo (Ruru)

2003
Ai Yori Aoshi Enishi (Natsuki Komiya)
Happy Lesson Advance (Uzuki Shitennō)
Maburaho (Elizabeth)
Raimuiro Senkitan (Akaito)

2004
My-HiMe (Yayoi Ota)

2005
Koi Koi Seven (Hifumi Inokai)
Best Student Council (Maachi Hisakawa)
Comic Party: Revolution (Ikumi Tachikawa)
Shakugan no Shana (Marianne)
Zoids: Genesis (Rei Mii)
My-Otome (Yayoi Ota)
Negima! Magister Negi Magi (Fūka Narutaki)
MÄR (Aqua)
Raimuiro Ryukitan X (Akaito)

2006
Canvas 2: Niji Iro no Sketch (Yuzu Nanashiro)
Negima!? (Fūka Narutaki)
Black Cat (Ellie)
Makai Senki Disgaea (Maharl)
Mamoru-kun ni Megami no Shukufuku o! (Yūka Maruyama)
The Wallflower (Madeleine)
Yume Tsukai (Wakaba)
Love Get Chu (Kiyoka Hōjō)
Rec (Tanaka)

2007
Kamichama Karin (Suzune Kujō)
Shakugan no Shana Second (Marianne)
Shugo Chara! (Pepe)
Dōjin Work (Sōra Kitano)
Prism Ark (Litte Ratus)
Reideen (Kuraka Saiga)

2008
Corpse Princess: Aka (Hikaru Yodomoe)
Shugo Chara!! Doki- (Pepe)
A Certain Magical Index (Komoe Tsukuyomi)
Nabari no Ou (Jūji Minami)
Rosario + Vampire (Yukari Sendō)
Rosario + Vampire Capu2 (Yukari Sendō)

2009
Asura Cryin' (Reiko Saeki)
Asura Cryin' 2 (Reiko Saeki)
Shugo Chara! Party! (Pepe)

2010
Ōkami-san and Her Seven Companions (Majolica le Fay)
Shukufuku no Campanella (Carina Verriti)
A Certain Scientific Railgun (Komoe Tsukuyomi)
A Certain Magical Index II (Komoe Tsukuyomi)

2011
Shakugan no Shana Final (Rinko)
Dream Eater Merry (Parade)

2012
Is This A Zombie? Of The Dead (Eucliwood Hellscythe (delusion))

2013
Soreike! Anpanman (Shimejiman)

2014
Karen Senki (Pinky Pakuchi)

2017
UQ Holder! (Fūka Narutaki)

2018
A Certain Magical Index III (Komoe Tsukuyomi)

2019
Manaria Friends (Roux)

2020
A Certain Scientific Railgun T (Komoe Tsukuyomi)

OVA
Happy Lesson: The Final (Uzuki Shitennō)
Kujibiki Unbalance (Koyuki Asagiri)
Negima! Shiroki Tsubasa Ala Alba (Fūka Narutaki)
Negima! Mō Hitotsu no Sekai (Fūka Narutaki)
Negima!? OVA Spring (Fūka Narutaki)
Negima!? OVA Summer (Fūka Narutaki)
Raimuiro Senkitan: The South Island Dream Romantic Adventure (Akaito)
Shukufuku no Campanella (Carina Verriti)
YU-NO: A girl who chants love at the bound of this world (Yu-no)

Films
A Certain Magical Index: The Miracle of Endymion (Komoe Tsukuyomi)
Dōbutsu no Mori (Timmy)
Negima! Magister Negi Magi: Anime Final (Fūka Narutaki)
Shakugan no Shana: The Movie (Marianne)
Smile Pretty Cure!: The Movie (Nico)

Drama CD
Haou Airen (Kurumi Akino)

Video games
YU-NO: A girl who chants love at the bound of this world (Yu-no)

References

External links
 
Kimiko Koyama at GamePlaza-Haruka Voice Acting Database 
Kimiko Koyama at Hitoshi Doi's Seiyuu Database

1979 births
Living people
Japanese women pop singers
Japanese video game actresses
Japanese voice actresses
Voice actresses from Tokushima Prefecture
Voice actors from Tokushima Prefecture